Dublin Dragons were an American Football team based in Lucan, Dublin, Ireland. In 2014, they reconstituted as a member-run club, changing their name to the South Dublin Panthers. The team practices were held at the Garda Rugby Club at Westmanstown near Lucan.

References

External links 
 IAFL official website

American football teams in County Dublin
American football teams in the Republic of Ireland
American football teams established in 2000
American football teams disestablished in 2014
2000 establishments in Ireland
2014 disestablishments in Ireland